Seminary Magazine was an American magazine published from 1863 to 1873. It was edited by W. M. Hazlewood, in Richmond, Virginia. It published literary and education material; in 1870 its name was changed to Old Dominion and, according to Frank Luther Mott, "its scope was broadened", but it folded in 1873.

References

Defunct magazines published in the United States
Agricultural magazines
Magazines established in 1863
Magazines disestablished in 1873
1877 establishments in the United States
Mass media in Richmond, Virginia
Magazines published in Virginia